Our Time Is Up is a 2004 live action short film, written and directed by Rob Pearlstein.

On January 31, 2006 it was nominated for the Academy Award for Best Live Action Short Film at the 78th Academy Awards. The designated nominees were Pearlstein and producer Pia Clemente. The film did not win; the Oscar instead went to Six Shooter.

References

External links 
 Film website (archived link, 2 February 2009)
 

2004 films